"Work" is a song by American rapper ASAP Ferg, released on August 20, 2012 as the third single from hip hop collective ASAP Mob's debut studio album Lords Never Worry (2012). The official remix of the song (titled "Work REMIX"), featuring American rappers ASAP Rocky, French Montana, Trinidad James and Schoolboy Q, was released on May 14, 2013. The remix served as the lead single from ASAP Ferg's debut studio album Trap Lord (2013).

Music videos
The official music video of the song was released on January 14, 2013. The video for the remix was released with the accompanying single, and was filmed in two parts with scenes from Los Angeles and Harlem.

Chart

Weekly charts

Year-end charts

Certifications

References

2012 debut singles
2012 songs
ASAP Ferg songs
ASAP Rocky songs
French Montana songs
Schoolboy Q songs
Songs written by ASAP Ferg
Songs written by ASAP Rocky
Songs written by French Montana
Songs written by Schoolboy Q
RCA Records singles